Bantè is a town, arrondissement, and commune in western Benin. It is located in the former Zou Province of which since 1999 is part of the Collines Department. The commune covers an area of 2695 square kilometres and as of 2013 had a population of 106,945 people. The majority of the population is ethnically Nago specifically of the Isha subgroup, who themselves are a subgroup of the Yoruba. It is famous for the art exhibition Nago Hunters of the Bante Kingdom by Jean-Dominique Burton.

Towns and villages
Settlements in the commune of Bantè include:

 Abidzi

Arrondissements
The nine Arrondissements in the commune of Bantè are:

 Agoua
 Akpassi
 Atokoligbe
 Bante
 Bobè
 Gouka
 Koko
 Lougba
 Pira

Notable people
Cudjoe Lewis, the third to last known survivor of the Atlantic slave trade between Africa and the United States, was born in Bantè in 1841.

References

Communes of Benin
Populated places in the Collines Department
Communes in Yorubaland